The 1988 Big South Conference men's basketball tournament took place March 3–5, 1988, at the Winthrop Coliseum in Rock Hill, South Carolina. For the first time in their school history, the Winthrop Eagles won the tournament, led by head coach Steve Vacendak.

Format
All of the conference's seven members participated in the tournament, hosted at the Winthrop Coliseum, home of the Winthrop Eagles. Teams were seeded by conference winning percentage.

Bracket

* Asterisk indicates overtime game
Source

All-Tournament Team
John Weiss, Winthrop
Shaun Wise, Winthrop
Greg Washington, Winthrop
Aswan Wainright, Radford
Oliver Johnson, Charleston Southern
Heder Ambroise, Charleston Southern

References

Tournament
Big South Conference men's basketball tournament
Big South Conference men's basketball tournament
Big South Conference men's basketball tournament